Marie-Colombe Robichaud (born 1943) is a Canadian writer living in Nova Scotia. Her work concerns itself with preserving the Acadian language and culture.

She was born in Chéticamp on Cape Breton Island. Robichaud founded the publishing company Les Éditions de la Piquine and the Théâtre de la Piquine. She has written and directed more than a dozen plays since 1995. She has also published several books on Acadian culture and history in both French and English. Her uncle Anselme Chiasson was also concerned with the preservation of Acadian culture.

Selected works 
 100 Petites Histoires du Passé, pour conserver notre langue et notre culture acadienne (3 volumes)
 Acadian Tales From Bygone Days
 L'arrivée des Robichaud en Acadie
 The Robichauds in Acadia
 Théotime et les feux follets
 Thorns and Roses: An Acadian Life Story

References 

1943 births
Living people
Acadian people
Writers from Nova Scotia
Canadian women dramatists and playwrights
Canadian women historians